Lengnau railway station is a railway station in the municipality of Lengnau, in the Swiss canton of Bern. It is an intermediate stop on the Basel–Biel/Bienne and Jura Foot lines, although trains traveling south on the Basel–Biel/Bienne line from Grenchen Nord do not stop here. It is served by regional trains only.

Services 
 the following services stop at Lengnau:

References

External links 
 
 

Railway stations in the canton of Bern
Swiss Federal Railways stations